Stretton may refer to:

People
Stretton (surname)
(Arthur) Stretton Reeve (1907-1981), English clergyman

Places

England
Stretton means "settlement on a Roman Road" (from the Old English "stræt" and "tun"). Of the seventeen places in England, all but two are situated on a Roman road, the exceptions being Stretton Westwood and Stretton en le Field.

Cheshire
Stretton, Cheshire West and Chester
Stretton Hall, Cheshire
Stretton Lower Hall
Stretton Old Hall
Stretton Watermill
Stretton, Warrington
Lower Stretton
RNAS Stretton (HMS Blackcap)

Derbyshire
Stretton, Derbyshire
Stretton railway station

Herefordshire
Stretton Grandison
Stretton Sugwas

Leicestershire
Stretton en le Field
Little Stretton, Leicestershire
Stretton Magna / Great Stretton
Stretton Hall, Leicestershire

Rutland
Stretton, Rutland

Shropshire
Stretton Westwood
Church Stretton
All Stretton
All Stretton Halt railway station
Church Stretton railway station
Little Stretton, Shropshire
Little Stretton Halt railway station
Stoney Stretton
Stretton Heath

Staffordshire
Stretton, East Staffordshire
Stretton and Claymills railway station
Stretton Junction
Stretton, South Staffordshire
Lapley, Stretton and Wheaton Aston
Stretton Aqueduct
Stretton Hall, Staffordshire

Warwickshire
Stretton Baskerville
Stretton-on-Dunsmore
Stretton-on-Fosse
Stretton-on-Fosse railway station
Stretton-under-Fosse

Australia

Queensland
The place in Australia is named after George Stretton, a 19th-century Englishman.
Stretton, Queensland
Electoral district of Stretton

Other uses
11626 Church Stretton (an asteroid)
Stretton, a novel by Henry Kingsley

See also

Stratton (disambiguation)